Christopher Evan Welch (September 28, 1965 – December 2, 2013) was an American TV, film, and stage actor. He is best known as the narrator in Woody Allen's Vicky Cristina Barcelona and his role as Peter Gregory in the HBO series Silicon Valley. He died due to complications from lung cancer in Santa Monica, California in 2013.

Early life
Welch was born in Fort Belvoir, Virginia. He attended the University of Dallas on a full scholarship and was a graduate of the school's drama program. He attended graduate school at the University of Washington School of Drama in Seattle, under the direction of Jack Clay.

Career
In 1999 Welch appeared in NBC’s Third Watch. He later appeared in the television series Law & Order: Special Victims Unit, the short film Custody, and the television film Hamlet. He then appeared in an episode each of The Practice, Law & Order: Criminal Intent, and Whoopi.

Welch had an extensive stage career. He appeared in several noted Off-Broadway productions, as well as in three Broadway shows.

In 2004, Welch appeared in the films Marie and Bruce, The Stepford Wives, and Keane. In 2005, he again appeared in Law & Order: Special Victims Unit, and also had roles in the films The Interpreter and War of the Worlds. In 2006, he had roles in the television shows, The Book of Daniel and The Sopranos, as well as the films The Hoax and The Good Shepherd.

Welch had roles in the 2008 films What Just Happened and Synecdoche, New York. He appeared as David Haig in the television series Law & Order from 2008 to 2010. In 2009, he appeared in the film Whatever Works and the television series Nurse Jackie. In 2010, he appeared as Grant Test in the AMC series Rubicon. In 2012, he appeared in the films The Master and Lincoln as Clerk of the House Edward McPherson, as well as a role in the television series Elementary. In 2013, he also had a role in the films Syrup and Admission, with a role in the television series Golden Boy.

At the time of his death, he was filming his scenes as Peter Gregory in the HBO series Silicon Valley, having completed five episodes. Welch's character was not written out of the show until the second season. When Silicon Valley won the Critics' Choice Television Award for Best Comedy Series, creator Mike Judge dedicated the award to Welch, at the request of Welch's co-star T.J. Miller.

Welch narrated The Last Apprentice series audiobooks, a young adult fantasy series, for Harper Audio, as well as other audiobooks.

Welch sang in a rock band, the Ottoman Bigwigs.

Death
On December 2, 2013, at the age of 48, Welch died due to complications of lung cancer at a hospital in Santa Monica, California.

Welch was survived by his wife Emma Roberts (m. 2008), their daughter, his parents, and his siblings.

Filmography

Film

Television

References

External links
 
 
 Obituary, The New York Times, December 5, 2013; accessed December 7, 2013.

1965 births
2013 deaths
American male film actors
American male stage actors
American male television actors
Deaths from lung cancer in California
Male actors from Virginia
University of Dallas alumni
People from Fort Belvoir, Virginia
HBO people
20th-century American male actors
21st-century American male actors